Lawrence Alexander (born October 22, 1991) is an American basketball player for Oberwart Gunners in the Austrian Basketball Superliga. He played college basketball for the North Dakota State Bison.  He can play both point guard and shooting guard.

High school career
Alexander attended Manual High School in Peoria, Illinois. As a senior, he averaged 15 points, 5 rebounds and 3 assists per game. His team were the 2A state runners-up. He was a first-team all-conference and all-state pick.

College career
As a senior in 2014–15, Alexander averaged 20.8 points per game. He was named the Summit League Player of the Year that season, and led the Bison to a regular season Summit League championship and an NCAA tournament berth.

Professional career
Following his college career, Alexander signed with Mitteldeutscher BC of the German Bundesliga. After being waived, Alexander joined BG Göttingen on a trial contract, but has since signed a two-year contract with Horsens IC of the Danish league Basketligaen. After two seasons with Horsens IC, Alexander signed one-year deal with BK Levickí Patrioti (Slovakia).

Alexander signed with the Oberwart Gunners in Austria in 2019. He averaged 17 points, 5.3 rebounds, and 3.4 assists per game. On November 6, 2020, Alexander re-signed with the team.

References

External links
North Dakota State Bison profile 
Horsens IC Profile

1991 births
Living people
American expatriate basketball people in Austria
American expatriate basketball people in Denmark
American expatriate basketball people in Germany
American expatriate basketball people in Slovakia
American men's basketball players
Basketball players from Illinois
BG Göttingen players
Horsens IC players
North Dakota State Bison men's basketball players
Point guards
Shooting guards
Sportspeople from Peoria, Illinois